Charles Parker House is a historic home located at Guilderland in Albany County, New York.  It was built in 1844 and is a large -story brick farmhouse in the Italianate style.  It features a bracketed cornice, gable roof with lantern, and four symmetrically placed chimneys.

It was listed on the National Register of Historic Places in 1982.

References

Houses on the National Register of Historic Places in New York (state)
Houses completed in 1844
Italianate architecture in New York (state)
Houses in Albany County, New York
National Register of Historic Places in Albany County, New York